A palindromic number (also known as a numeral palindrome or a numeric palindrome) is a number (such as 16461) that remains the same when its digits are reversed. In other words, it has reflectional symmetry across a vertical axis. The term palindromic is derived from palindrome, which refers to a word (such as rotor or racecar) whose spelling is unchanged when its letters are reversed. The first 30 palindromic numbers (in decimal) are:
  0, 1, 2, 3, 4, 5, 6, 7, 8, 9, 11, 22, 33, 44, 55, 66, 77, 88, 99, 101, 111, 121, 131, 141, 151, 161, 171, 181, 191, 202, … .

Palindromic numbers receive most attention in the realm of recreational mathematics. A typical problem asks for numbers that possess a certain property and are palindromic. For instance:
 The palindromic primes are 2, 3, 5, 7, 11, 101, 131, 151, ... .
 The palindromic square numbers are 0, 1, 4, 9, 121, 484, 676, 10201, 12321, ... .

It is obvious that in any base there are infinitely many palindromic numbers, since in any base the infinite sequence of numbers written (in that base) as 101, 1001, 10001, 100001, etc. consists solely of palindromic numbers.

Formal definition
Although palindromic numbers are most often considered in the decimal system, the concept of palindromicity can be applied to the natural numbers in any numeral system. Consider a number n > 0 in base b ≥ 2, where it is written in standard notation with k+1 digits ai as:

with, as usual, 0 ≤ ai < b for all i and ak ≠ 0. Then n is palindromic if and only if ai = ak−i for all i. Zero is written 0 in any base and is also palindromic by definition.

Decimal palindromic numbers
All numbers in base 10 (and indeed in any base) with one digit are palindromic, so there are ten decimal palindromic numbers with one digit:
{0, 1, 2, 3, 4, 5, 6, 7, 8, 9}.

There are 9 palindromic numbers with two digits:
{11, 22, 33, 44, 55, 66, 77, 88, 99}.

There are 90 palindromic numbers with three digits (Using the Rule of product: 9 choices for the first digit - which determines the third digit as well - multiplied by 10 choices for the second digit):
{101, 111, 121, 131, 141, 151, 161, 171, 181, 191, …, 909, 919, 929, 939, 949, 959, 969, 979, 989, 999}

There are likewise 90 palindromic numbers with four digits (again, 9 choices for the first digit multiplied by ten choices for the second digit. The other two digits are determined by the choice of the first two):
{1001, 1111, 1221, 1331, 1441, 1551, 1661, 1771, 1881, 1991, …, 9009, 9119, 9229, 9339, 9449, 9559, 9669, 9779, 9889, 9999},
so there are 199 palindromic numbers below 104.

Below 105 there are 1099 palindromic numbers and for other exponents of 10n we have: 1999, 10999, 19999, 109999, 199999, 1099999, ... . The number of palindromic numbers which have some other property are listed below:

Perfect powers
There are many palindromic perfect powers nk, where n is a natural number and k is 2, 3 or 4.
 Palindromic squares: 0, 1, 4, 9, 121, 484, 676, 10201, 12321, 14641, 40804, 44944, ... 
 Palindromic cubes: 0, 1, 8, 343, 1331, 1030301, 1367631, 1003003001, ... 
 Palindromic fourth powers: 0, 1, 14641, 104060401, 1004006004001, ... 

The first nine terms of the sequence 12, 112, 1112, 11112, ... form the palindromes 1, 121, 12321, 1234321, ... 

The only known non-palindromic number whose cube is a palindrome is 2201, and it is a conjecture the fourth root of all the palindrome fourth powers are a palindrome with 100000...000001 (10n + 1).

G. J. Simmons conjectured there are no palindromes of form nk for k > 4 (and n > 1).

Other bases
Palindromic numbers can be considered in numeral systems other than decimal. For example, the binary palindromic numbers are those with the binary representations:
0, 1, 11, 101, 111, 1001, 1111, 10001, 10101, 11011, 11111, 100001, ... 
or in decimal:
0, 1, 3, 5, 7, 9, 15, 17, 21, 27, 31, 33, ... 
The Fermat primes and the Mersenne primes form a subset of the binary palindromic primes.

Even excluding cases where the number is smaller than the base, most numbers are palindromic in more than one base. For example, . A number  is never palindromic in base  if .

A number that is non-palindromic in all bases b in the range 2 ≤ b ≤ n − 2 can be called a strictly non-palindromic number. For example, the number 6 is written as "110" in base 2, "20" in base 3, and "12" in base 4, none of which are palindromes. All strictly non-palindromic numbers larger than 6 are prime.

Antipalindromic numbers
Formally, in the usual decomposition of a natural number into its digits  in base , a number is antipalindromic iff .

Lychrel process
Non-palindromic numbers can be paired with palindromic ones via a series of operations.  First, the non-palindromic number is reversed and the result is added to the original number. If the result is not a palindromic number, this is repeated until it gives a palindromic number. Such number is called "a delayed palindrome".

It is not known whether all non-palindromic numbers can be paired with palindromic numbers in this way.  While no number has been proven to be unpaired, many do not appear to be.  For example, 196 does not yield a palindrome even after 700,000,000 iterations. Any number that never becomes palindromic in this way is known as a Lychrel number.

On January 24, 2017, the number 1,999,291,987,030,606,810 was published in OEIS as A281509 and announced "The Largest Known Most Delayed Palindrome". The sequence of 125 261-step most delayed palindromes preceding 1,999,291,987,030,606,810 and not reported before was published separately as A281508.

Sum of the reciprocals
The sum of the reciprocals of the palindromic numbers is a convergent series, whose value is approximately 3.37028... .

Scheherazade numbers
Scheherazade numbers are a set of numbers identified by Buckminster Fuller in his book Synergetics.  Fuller does not give a formal definition for this term, but from the examples he gives, it can be understood to be those numbers that contain a factor of the primorial n#, where n≥13 and is the largest prime factor in the number.  Fuller called these numbers Scheherazade numbers because they must have a factor of 1001.  Scheherazade is the storyteller of One Thousand and One Nights, telling a new story each night to delay her execution.  Since n must be at least 13, the primorial must be at least 1·2·3·5·7·11·13, and 7×11×13 = 1001.  Fuller also refers to powers of 1001 as Scheherazade numbers.  The smallest primorial containing Scheherazade number is 13# = 30,030.

Fuller pointed out that some of these numbers are palindromic by groups of digits.  For instance 17# = 510,510 shows a symmetry of groups of three digits.  Fuller called such numbers Scheherazade Sublimely Rememberable Comprehensive Dividends, or SSRCD numbers.  Fuller notes that 1001 raised to a power not only produces sublimely rememberable numbers that are palindromic in three-digit groups, but also the values of the groups are the binomial coefficients. For instance,

This sequence fails at (1001)13 because there is a carry digit taken into the group to the left in some groups.  Fuller suggests writing these spillovers on a separate line.  If this is done, using more spillover lines as necessary, the symmetry is preserved indefinitely to any power.  Many other Scheherazade numbers show similar symmetries when expressed in this way.

Sums of palindromes 
In 2018, a paper was published demonstrating that every positive integer can be written as the sum of three palindromic numbers in every number system with base 5 or greater.

See also 
Lychrel number
Palindromic prime
Palindrome

Notes

References
Malcolm E. Lines: A Number for Your Thoughts: Facts and Speculations about Number from Euclid to the latest Computers: CRC Press 1986, S. 61 (Limited Online-Version (Google Books))

External links

Jason Doucette - 196 Palindrome Quest / Most Delayed Palindromic Number
196 and Other Lychrel Numbers
On General Palindromic Numbers at MathPages
Palindromic Numbers to 100,000 from Ask Dr. Math
P. De Geest, Palindromic cubes
Yutaka Nishiyama, Numerical Palindromes and the 196 Problem, IJPAM, Vol.80, No.3, 375–384, 2012.

Base-dependent integer sequences
Palindromes

pl:Palindrom#Palindromy liczbowe